Krobu (Krobou) is a Tano language (Kwa, Niger–Congo) of Ivory Coast.

References

Potou–Tano languages
Languages of Ivory Coast